Indacaterol/mometasone, sold under the brand name Atectura Breezhaler among others, is a fixed-dose combination medication for the treatment of asthma in adults and adolescents twelve years of age and older not adequately controlled with inhaled corticosteroids and inhaled short acting beta2 agonists.

The most common side effects include worsening of asthma and nasopharyngitis (inflammation in the nose and throat). Other common side effects include upper respiratory tract infection (nose and throat infections) and headache. Indacaterol/mometasone was approved for medical use in the European Union in May 2020, and in Japan in June 2020.

References

External links 
 

Antiasthmatic drugs
Combination drugs
Corticosteroid esters
Furoates
Glucocorticoids
Long-acting beta2-adrenergic agonists